Dalmatovsky District is an administrative and municipal district (raion), one of the twenty-four in Kurgan Oblast, Russia. It is located in the northwest of the oblast. Its administrative center is the town of Dalmatovo. Population:  35,176 (2002 Census);  The population of Dalmatovo accounts for 47.2% of the district's total population.

References

Notes

Sources

Districts of Kurgan Oblast